was a Japanese animation studio located in Suginami, Tokyo.

History
The studio was founded in March 1999 by Triangle Staff former member Katsumi Yamaguchi and its first production was the film A Tree of Palme in 2001. Directed by Takashi Nakamura, the film was an official selection of the 2002 Berlin Film Festival. After having minor roles in 2002 TV series Saikano and Monkey Typhoon, Palm was the main studio under the production of Tetsujin 28-go and Genshiken, both in 2004. The studio produced Genshiken spin-off OVA series Kujibiki Unbalance. In 2006 it was the animation studio responsible for the TV version of Bartender. In 2007 it co-produced the TV series Master of Epic: The Animation Age with Gonzino and animated the film  Tetsujin 28-go: Hakuchū no Zangetsu.

Works

Television series
Tetsujin 28-go (2004)
Genshiken (2004)
Bartender (2006)
Master of Epic: The Animation Age (2007, with Gonzo)

Films
A Tree of Palme (2002)
Tetsujin 28-go (2007)

OVAs
Kujibiki Unbalance (2004–2005; production, animated by Ajia-do Animation Works)

References

External links

Japanese animation studios
Animation studios in Tokyo
Defunct mass media companies of Japan
Film production companies of Japan
Mass media companies established in 1999
Mass media companies disestablished in 2007
Japanese companies established in 1999
Japanese companies disestablished in 2007
Suginami